Umberto Giardina is a male former international table tennis player from Italy.

He won a bronze medal at the 2000 World Team Table Tennis Championships in the Swaythling Cup (men's team event) with Massimiliano Mondello, Valentino Piacentini and Yang Min for Italy.

He was the 2008 Italian champion.

See also
 List of table tennis players
 List of World Table Tennis Championships medalists

References

Italian male table tennis players
Living people
Year of birth missing (living people)